Among the European languages, German has the third highest number of translations of the Tirukkural, after English and French. As of 2015, there were at least eight translations of the Kural text available in German.

History

The first translations of the Kural text into German were made by August Friedrich Caemmerer in 1803 and by Friedrich Rückert in 1847. However, these remained incomplete. Caemmerer translated only the first two books, viz. the Book of Virtue and the Book of Wealth. The first well-known complete German translation was made by Karl Graul in 1856. He published it in 220 pages under the title Der Kural des Tiruvalluver. Ein gnomisches Gedicht über die drei Strebeziele des Menschen as the third volume of the four-volume work Bibliotheca Tamulica sive Opera Praecipia Tamuliensium. Graul's translation is considered a scholarly one by various scholars including Kamil Zvelebil, who in 1962 praised the translation thus: "As far as I know, the two best translations of Tirukkural had been till this day, Graul’s old German version … and V. V. S. Iyer’s (translation in English)." Speaking about the Kural in his introduction, Graul said, "No translation can convey any idea of its charming effect. It is truly an apple of gold in a network of silver." The nineteenth century witnessed one more translation by Albrecht Frenz and K. Lalithambal in 1877 (titled Thirukural von Thiruvalluvar aus dem Tamil).

Translations

See also
 Tirukkural translations
 List of Tirukkural translations by language

References

Published translations
 Karl Graul (Trans.). (1856). Der Kural des Tiruvalluver. Ein gnomisches Gedicht über die drei Strebeziele des Menschen. (Bibliotheca Tamulica sive Opera Praecipia Tamuliensium, Volume 3). Leipzig: Dörffling & Franke; London: Williams & Norgate. 220 pages. ( Digitalisat)

German
Translations into German